Gérald Forton (10 April 1931 – 16 December 2021) was a Belgian-born French comic book artist.

Life and career
In 1950, Forton wrote his first short stories in Caméra 34. In 1951, he illustrated Jim Cartouche. The following year, he began illustrating the series L'oncle Paul for Spirou. In 1953, he created  alongside author Jean-Michel Charlier. Throughout the 1960s, he illustrated multiple influential comic series in the Francophone world, such as Grégory le Marin, and Blake and Mortimer. He also illustrated the French versions of several Marvel Comics, such as Spider-Man, Thor, the Hulk, Captain America, and the Fantastic Four. In the 1980s, he collaborated with DC Comics, Eclipse Comics, and First Comics.

Alongside his activities as a cartoonist, Forton participated in the storyboards for the animated series The Legend of Prince Valiant. He returned to the Franco-Belgian comics scene with Semic Comics in the early 2000s. In 2017, he illustrated a new edition of the  series, Teddy Ted 1899, more than forty years after the series' last publication in Pif Gadget.

Forton died on 16 December 2021, at the age of 90.

References

1931 births
2021 deaths
20th-century Belgian artists
21st-century Belgian artists
People from Brussels